H. Allen Orr (born 1960) is the Shirley Cox Kearns Professor of Biology at the University of Rochester.

Education and career 
Orr earned his bachelor's degree in Biology and Philosophy from the College of William and Mary and his Ph.D. in Biology from the University of Chicago.  At Chicago, Orr studied under Jerry Coyne.  He performed postdoctoral research at the University of California, Davis.

Work 
Orr is an evolutionary geneticist whose research focuses on the genetics of speciation and the genetics of adaptation, in particular on the genetic basis of hybrid sterility and inviability. How many genes cause reproductive isolation between species? What are the normal functions of these genes and what evolutionary forces drove their divergence? He studies these problems through genetic analysis of reproductive isolation between species of Drosophila.

In his adaptation work, Orr is interested in theoretical rules or patterns that might characterize the population genetics of adaptation. He studies these patterns using both population genetic theory and experiment.  His early work on Drosophila set the terms of much of the current research on speciation.  Orr is said to be one of the few evolutionary biologists ever to have made fundamental contributions about how changes occur within lineages over time, and about how lineages split to result in new species.

Speciation 
His book Speciation, co-authored with Jerry Coyne, was hailed in Science as "exceedingly well-written and persuasive". They consider that studying speciation is largely synonymous with studying reproductive isolation, and explore what we know about where, when, and how isolating barriers evolve. Following Ernst Mayr they argue that speciation usually occurs where populations are geographically isolated or allopatric. They present evidence for the primacy of natural and sexual selection over genetic drift in driving speciation. Signatures of positive selection on genes involved in postzygotic isolation and reproductive proteins as well as experimental evidence from both the lab and field connect adaptation and sexual selection to reproductive isolation. They also present evidence for the congruence of the Dobzhansky-Muller model for the evolution of postzygotic isolation with the genetics of hybrid incompatibilities in many natural systems. Results that support their conclusions in the book continue to be published.

Philosophy, science and religion 
Orr frequently reviews books that seek to link biological ideas to religion or philosophy - this aspect of his work was specifically cited in his appointment as Shirley Cox Kearns Professor.

He believes that "Good science demands two things: that you ask the right questions and that you get the right answers. Although science education focuses almost exclusively on the second task, a good case can be made that the first is both the harder and the more important. Getting Mendel's laws from Mendel's data may not be easy, but surely the hardest part is daring to ask Mendel's question: Despite all appearances to the contrary, might heredity obey simple laws?".

Orr considers "scientism, the view that all truths are ultimately scientific" to be naive, hubristic and just plain wrong and is generally critical of what he sees as unwarranted attempts to generalise or draw philosophical conclusions from scientific facts. He laments the popular trend whereby "some pet theory gets elevated to its rightful place as 'the' way to think about evolution. But this longing to dress up biology in unusual new perspectives has, so far, yielded more book deals than results".

He is highly critical of William Dembski's 2002 book No Free Lunch suggesting that although the counterintuitive No Free Lunch theorems of computer science do indeed rule out the generation of specified complexity in a specific technical sense, this has nothing to do with Darwinism which is not trying to reach a pre-specified target, and of Michael Behe's 1996 book Darwin's Black Box which he characterises as "cleverly argued, biologically informed — and wrong". He concedes that there are biological systems which are irreducibly complex in Behe's sense but suggests that "An irreducibly complex system can be built gradually by adding parts that, while initially just advantageous, become — because of later changes — essential". He also suggests that, while he has "utter confidence in Behe's biochemistry" Behe "is not at home in the technical evolution literature."

However he is also critical of Daniel Dennett, Steven Pinker and Richard Dawkins, expressing serious reservations about their arguments and defending these in extended follow-up correspondence.

Orr is not satisfied by Stephen Jay Gould's NOMA suggestion. Whilst highly critical of claims that physics has "found God" he points out that "many of the [20th] century’s leading scientists – including some of the brightest stars of evolutionary biology...were deeply religious... Theodosius Dobzhansky was a Christian and something of an amateur theologian; Sir Ronald Fisher was a deeply devout Anglican who, between founding modern statistics and population genetics, penned articles for church magazines; and J.B.S. Haldane was an unabashed mystic".  Moreover, Orr thinks that Gould's redefinition of religion to be solely concerned with moral values is not what anyone who practices the thing means by religion (or almost anyone, anyway), and that it will not do to pretend that all will be well in some imagined world where people of goodwill pursue invariably consonant views. So whereas it may be that the road Gould cuts is in a sensible enough direction (a considerable improvement over the present state in which creationists pester scientists and scientists preach values, and avoiding many of the inanities that often accompany talk of religion by scientists) it is a far bumpier road than Gould lets on.

Awards and recognition 
Orr has been the recipient of a Guggenheim Fellowship, a David and Lucile Packard Fellowship, an Alfred P. Sloan Foundation Postdoctoral Fellowship, and a Rockefeller Foundation Scholar in Residence Fellowship at Bellagio Study Center, Italy.  He was awarded the Dobzhansky Prize by the Society for the Study of Evolution and the Young Investigator Prize by the American Society of Naturalists.  He was also named Professor of the Year in Natural Sciences by the Student Association at University of Rochester in 2002.  In 2008 he was one of thirteen recipients of the Darwin-Wallace Medal, which is bestowed every 50 years by the Linnean Society of London.

Publications
Orr is widely published in some of the leading scientific journals including Nature,  Science and PNAS.

Books
 Speciation. 2004. .

Scientific publications
Orr's papers include:

 "A test of Fisher’s theory of dominance", PNAS
 "Haldane's rule has multiple genetic causes", Nature
 "A mathematical model of Haldane's rule", Evolution
 "The evolutionary genetics of speciation", Phil. Trans. Roy. Soc. Lond. B
 "The population genetics of adaptation:  the distribution of factors fixed during adaptive evolution", Evolution
 "Haldane's rule is obeyed in taxa lacking a hemizygous X", Science
 "Morphological innovation and developmental genetics", PNAS
 "Adaptive evolution drives divergence of a hybrid inviability gene in Drosophila", Nature

Notes and references

External links
Orr lab website
H. Allen Orr at The New York Review of Books

Living people
Evolutionary biologists
College of William & Mary alumni
Critics of creationism
University of Chicago alumni
University of California, Davis alumni
University of Rochester faculty
1960 births